The West Indian national cricket team toured Zimbabwe in October and November 2003 and played a two-match Test series against the Zimbabwean national cricket team. West Indies won the Test series 1–0. West Indies were captained by Brian Lara and Zimbabwe by Heath Streak. In addition, the teams played a five-match series of Limited Overs Internationals (LOI) which West Indies won 3–2.

Test series summary

1st Test

2nd Test

ODI series summary

1st ODI

2nd ODI

3rd ODI

4th ODI

5th ODI

References

External links

2003 in West Indian cricket
2003 in Zimbabwean cricket
2003–04
International cricket competitions in 2003–04
Zimbabwean cricket seasons from 2000–01